Cymindis hiekei is a species of ground beetle in the subfamily Harpalinae. It was described by Jedlicka in 1969.

References

hiekei
Beetles described in 1969